Letitia "Tish" Baldrige (February 9, 1926 – October 29, 2012) was an American etiquette expert, public relations executive and author who was most famous for serving as Jacqueline Kennedy's Social Secretary.

Known as the "Doyenne of Decorum", she wrote a newspaper column, ran her own PR firm, and, along with updating Amy Vanderbilt's Complete Book of Etiquette, she published 20 books and appeared on Late Night with David Letterman and the cover of Time magazine.

Early life
Letitia Baldrige was born February 9, 1926, in Miami, Florida, and grew up in Omaha, Nebraska, the youngest child of Republican Congressman Howard Malcolm Baldrige and his wife, Regina (née Connell). Her brother was Howard Malcolm Baldrige, Jr., the initial Secretary of Commerce during the Ronald Reagan administration.

Baldrige attended Miss Porter's School in Farmington, CT, where she met Jacqueline Bouvier, the future First Lady. The two also attended Vassar College together, from which Baldrige graduated in 1946 with a bachelor's degree in psychology.

Career

Early years
After first being denied a position and told to improve her secretarial skills, she reapplied and was hired by the State Department as social secretary to David K.E. Bruce, US ambassador to France. After three years she was appointed secretary in Rome to the American ambassador to Italy, Clare Boothe Luce, followed by a position as director of public relations for the jeweller Tiffany & Co.

Although then a registered Republican, in 1960 she was invited to work for the Kennedy campaign in Massachusetts once he secured the Democratic presidential nomination, going on to work officially for the First Lady after his victory. Baldridge served in the post of White House Social Secretary, coordinating aspects of the Inauguration, receptions, and state dinners. Saying she "had had it" with the long days in Washington and serving the administration on overseas trips, she resigned early in 1963, to return briefly to aid the First Lady after her husband's assassination in November of that year.

After the Kennedy White House
She served on the board of directors of the Malcolm Baldrige National Quality Award. She also did significant charity work with Jane Goodall to help fundraise for the preservation of habitats for wild chimpanzees.

In 1964, the year after marrying real estate developer Robert Hollensteiner, whom she met while working for a Kennedy family firm, she founded her own PR business, Letitia Baldrige Enterprises, Chicago. Earning the nickname the "Doyenne of Decorum" with a newspaper column and a string of successful books, in 1978 she appeared on the November 28th cover of Time. She continued working into late life, publishing books in every decade from the 1950s, her final book being, Taste: Acquiring What Money Can't Buy, released in 2007.

Death
Baldrige died of cardiac complications at a nursing facility in Bethesda, Maryland, on October 29, 2012. Mary M. Mitchell, a longtime friend and collaborator, confirmed her death. She was survived by her husband, Robert Hollensteiner, and their two children, Clare and Malcolm.

References

Bibliography

 Roman Candle, 1956
 Tiffany Table Settings, 1958
 Of Diamonds and Diplomats, 1968
 Home, 1972
 Juggling: The Art of Balancing Marriage, Motherhood, and Career, 1976
 The Amy Vanderbilt Complete Book of Etiquette, 1978
 Amy Vanderbilt’s Everyday Etiquette, 1979
 Entertainers, 1981
 Letitia Baldrige’s Complete Guide to Executive Manners, 1985
 Letitia Baldrige’s Complete Guide to a Great Social Life, 1987
 Letitia Baldrige’s Complete Guide to the New Manners for the '90s, 1989
 Public Affairs, Private Relations, 1990 (a novel)
 Letitia Baldrige’s New Complete Guide to Executive Manners, 1993
 Letitia Baldrige’s More than Manners! Raising Today's Kids to Have Kind Manners and Good Hearts, 1997
 In the Kennedy Style: Magical Evenings in the Kennedy White House (with Rene Verdon), 1998
 Legendary Brides: From the Most Romantic Weddings Ever, Inspired Ideas for Today’s Brides, 2000
 A Lady, First: My Life in the White House and the American Embassies of Paris and Rome, 2001
 Letitia Baldrige’s New Manners for New Times: A Complete Guide to Etiquette, 2003
 The Kennedy Mystique (with Jon Goodman, Hugh Sidey, Robert Dallek and Barbara Baker Burrows), 2006
 Taste: Acquiring What Money Can't Buy, 2007

External links 
 Official site

 Gates, Anita, "Letitia Baldrige, Etiquette Maven, Is Dead at 86", The New York Times, October 30, 2012
 Obituary, The Telegraph
 Langer, Emily, "Letitia Baldrige dies at 86; ‘doyenne of decorum’ was social secretary to first lady Jacqueline Kennedy", The Washington Post, October 30, 2012
 Biography
 Biography
 Fabricant, Florence, "AT TEA WITH: Letitia Baldrige; The Calming Voice of Civility In Uncivil Times", The New York Times, July 8, 1992
 Letitia Baldrige on NPR
 Brief Appearance on Letterman

2012 deaths
1926 births
Kennedy administration personnel
Vassar College alumni
Miss Porter's School alumni
Etiquette writers
Writers from Nebraska
Writers from Washington, D.C.
Jacqueline Kennedy Onassis